Yang Qingpei (born 1989) is a Chinese confessed mass murderer of 19 people.  He confessed to killing his parents in an argument over money and then killing 17 neighbours with a pickaxe in an attempt to cover up his crime on September 29, 2016,  state media reported. The youngest victim of the murderous rampage in a remote village in southwest China was three, the oldest 72. They were members of six families. Suspect Yang Qingpei, aged 28, went to his home village of Yema on Wednesday. He was arrested in Kunming, capital of Yunnan Province, on Thursday. The crime took place in Qujing, Yunnan Province. On July 28, 2017, Yang was sentenced to death.

See also
List of rampage killers in China

References

External links
云南19人被杀案告破：嫌疑人杀死父母后在昆明被抓,  (September 30, 2016)
Chinese police arrest man suspected of killing 19 people
Chinese Villager Yang Qingpei Accused Of Killing Parents, Then 17 Others

Mass murder in 2016
Massacres in 2016
Mass stabbings in China
Knife attacks
2016 murders in China
September 2016 crimes in Asia
21st-century mass murder in China
Massacres in China
Parricides
Family murders